Franz Maierhofer (21 December 1897 – 22 August 1943) was a Gauleiter of the Nazi Party for the Upper Palatinate and Lower Bavaria. He was also a member of the SS and the Wehrmacht. He was killed in action on the Russian Front in World War II.

Early years
The tenth child of a locomotive operator, he grew up in Regensburg. After high school, at the outbreak of World War I in 1914 he enlisted as a volunteer with the 11th Royal Bavarian Infantry Regiment. He attended officer training classes and was promoted to Leutnant in August 1916. In April 1917 he was wounded and taken prisoner by the French. He was awarded the Iron Cross, first and second class. He returned to Germany in April 1920, and was discharged from the service with a 20% disability. He resumed his education, training as an elementary school teacher in Amberg from 1920 to 1922. He passed his teaching examinations in December 1922. In 1923 he became an assistant teacher and in 1925 he was employed as a teacher. In 1930 he took up a teaching position in Auerbach in the Upper Palatinate (Oberpfalz). He was eventually dismissed from public school service on 1 November 1932 due to his political activities.

Nazi career
On 16 April 1927 Maierhofer joined the Nazi Party (membership number 59,524). He served as Bezirksleiter (District Leader) in Auerbach from 1927. He was named Deputy Gauleiter of the Upper Palatinate in November 1929 when Gauleiter Adolf Wagner was transferred to Greater Munich. As such, he administered the Gau until June 1930 when Edmund Heines came in as Acting Gauleiter. When Heines left to take up a staff position in the Sturmabteilung (SA) high command, Maierhofer was named Gauleiter of the Upper Palatinate on 15 November 1930. In September 1930 he was elected to the Reichstag from electoral constituency 25 (Lower Bavaria) and served only one term until the next election in 1932. In April 1931 he became the editor of a Nazi daily newspaper named Schaffendes Volk.

On the resignation of Otto Erbersdobler of the neighboring Gau of Lower Bavaria (Niederbayern) on 1 April 1932, Maierhofer was assigned the leadership of that jurisdiction in addition to his own. On 17 August the Gaue of Upper Palatinate and Lower Bavaria were formally merged and Maierhofer became Gauleiter of the newly named Gau Lower Bavaria-Upper Palatinate (Niederbayern-Oberpfalz). However just several months later, the SA leadership of the Gau filed a complaint alleging that Maierhofer had not properly allocated money due to the SA. He was relieved of his office on 13 January 1933. On 19 January, his Gau was merged with Upper Franconia into Gau Bavarian-East March (Bayerische Ostmark) under the leadership of Hans Schemm, the Upper Franconian Gauleiter.

In November 1933 Maierhofer joined the Schutzstaffel (SS) and held several staff positions between 1935 and 1937, including in the office of the Reichsführer-SS. On 20 April 1936 he attained the rank of SS-Obersturmbannführer. In 1937 he secured a position with the Bavarian State government as an advisor in the Ministry of Education and Culture.

In 1937 Maierhofer reentered military service as a Leutnant of the reserves. At the outbreak of World War II, he served on active duty with Infantry Regiment 50 of the 3rd Infantry Division. After 1941, he saw action on the Eastern Front, advancing to the rank of Hauptmann in July 1942. In February 1943 he was promoted to Major as commander of Grenadier Regiment 315 of the 167th Infantry Division, but was killed in action at the Fourth Battle of Kharkov on 22 August 1943.

References

Bibliography

External links
Bavarian Historical Lexicon

1897 births
1943 deaths
Gauleiters
German Army personnel killed in World War II
German newspaper editors
Members of the Reichstag of the Weimar Republic
Nazi Party officials
Nazi Party politicians
People from Rosenheim
Recipients of the Iron Cross (1914), 1st class
Recipients of the Iron Cross (1914), 2nd class
SS-Obersturmbannführer
German Army officers of World War II
German Army personnel of World War I